Terence Jariviz Barnes (born June 14, 1990) is an American football defensive tackle for the Arlington Renegades of the XFL. He played college football at Georgia Tech. He signed with the Jacksonville Jaguars as an undrafted free agent in 2013, and has also played with the New York Jets, Buffalo Bills, Carolina Panthers, Atlanta Legends, and New York Guardians.

Early years
Barnes attended Enterprise High School. He was ranked as the 48th-best offensive tackle prospect nationally by Rivals.com and also was ranked by Rivals.com as the 18th-best prep prospect in the state of Alabama.

College career
Barnes was selected to the Sporting News 2009 ACC All-Freshman Team following his Freshman season. He was a 2012 All-ACC Honorable Mention. He was selected to participate in the 2012 Raycom Collegiate All-Star Game.

Professional career

Jacksonville Jaguars
On April 27, 2013, Barnes signed with the Jacksonville Jaguars as an undrafted free agent. On August 30, 2013, he was released.

New York Jets
On October 9, 2013, Barnes was signed by the New York Jets to join the practice squad. The Jets waived Barnes on November 12, 2015. On November 13, 2015, he was re-signed to the practice squad.

Buffalo Bills
On December 1, 2015, Barnes was claimed off waivers by the Bills. On August 15, 2016, Barnes was released by the Bills.

Jacksonville Jaguars (second stint)
On August 17, 2016, Barnes was claimed off waivers by the Jaguars. On September 3, 2016, he was released by the Jaguars.

Kansas City Chiefs
On October 20, Barnes was signed to the Kansas City Chiefs practice squad. He was promoted to the active roster on December 3, 2016. He was released by the Chiefs on June 9, 2017.

Atlanta Legends
In September 2018, Barnes signed with Atlanta Legends of the Alliance of American Football for the 2019 season.

Carolina Panthers
After the AAF suspended football operations, Barnes signed with the Carolina Panthers on April 8, 2019. He was waived on June 11, 2019.

New York Guardians
Barnes was drafted in the 4th round during phase three in the 2020 XFL Draft by the New York Guardians. He had his contract terminated when the league suspended operations on April 10, 2020.

Arlington Renegades 
On November 17, 2022, Barnes was drafted by the Arlington Renegades of the XFL.

References

External links
Georgia Tech Yellow Jackets bio
New York Jets bio

1990 births
Living people
Players of American football from Montgomery, Alabama
American football defensive tackles
Georgia Tech Yellow Jackets football players
Jacksonville Jaguars players
New York Jets players
Buffalo Bills players
Kansas City Chiefs players
Atlanta Legends players
Carolina Panthers players
New York Guardians players
Massachusetts Pirates players
Arlington Renegades players